Terrestrial Paradise is a painting by Netherlandish artist Hieronymus Bosch, dating from around 1490. It is now in the Gallerie dell'Accademia in Venice, Italy. The painting depicts Terrestrial Paradise, where the remaining sins of the saved were washed away. The Fountain of Life stands on top of the hill.

This artwork is part of a series of four, the others are Ascent of the Blessed, Fall of the Damned into Hell and Hell.

References

Paintings by Hieronymus Bosch
1490s paintings
Nude art
Angels in art
Birds in art
Paintings in the Gallerie dell'Accademia